Bahadoran Rural District is in the Central District of Mehriz County, Yazd province, Iran. At the National Census of 2006, its population was 4,327 in 1,111 households. There were 4,124 inhabitants in 1,260 households at the following census of 2011. At the most recent census of 2016, the population of the rural district was 4,916 in 1,461 households. The largest of its 139 villages was Moradabad, with 1,538 people.

References 

Mehriz County

Rural Districts of Yazd Province

Populated places in Yazd Province

Populated places in Mehriz County